Lingen  is a village and civil parish, situated in the wooded hills of Herefordshire, England in the Welsh Marches near to the border with Wales and close to the larger village of Wigmore. Situated in the north-west corner of the county, Lingen parish includes the hamlets of Deerfold, Limebrook, Birtley and Willey. It lies on the Limebrook which runs into the River Lugg south of the village. It lies at a height of between 145 and 283 metres above sea level.

The village today has a public house – the Royal George – and a sub-post office.

History

Pre-history
The village lies at the southern edge of the ancient ice sheet and was sandwiched between two large post-glacial lakes; one centred on Presteigne, the other known to geologists as Wigmore Glacial Lake.

Geologically, the region is based entirely on Silurian beds, namely the marine Silurian and sizeable outcrops of Downtonian.

Early history

Occupied since at least the Middle Ages; there is evidence of medieval strip lynchets on a hillside near the village. It is mentioned in the Domesday Book.
The village is close to the substantial Mortimer castle at Wigmore and there is evidence of an early motte and bailey castle in the village. It has not been excavated but the former presence of a stone keep has been suggested, as well as a 12th-century gate-house, with a curtain wall around the bailey.

The village website suggests a Celtic origin for the name of the village: place of sparkling water. Ling is Old English for heather and may be an alternative toponymological derivation. The Institute for Name Studies speculates that the name was originally that of a river.

The manorial lordship was held by the Lingen family until the 17th century.

Limebrook Priory

Located just south of the village centre a nunnery was founded before the reign of Richard I, either by Ralph de Lingen or one of the Mortimers. There is some confusion as to the order to which it belonged, but in the time of Bishop Booth, 1516–35, it was tenanted by Augustinian nuns and subsisted until the dissolution of the monasteries. Remains now consist of a single ruined building.

Victorian
In 1868 the village was described thus:

St Michael and All Angels Church 
Built of stone, the church dates back to the 13th century when the original was built. The current building was substantially repaired in the 19th century and the bell tower turret has attractive wooden shingles. It was re-dedicated on 22 April 1891 by the Bishop of Hereford.

Methodist Chapel
The chapel opened on 26 June 1877 and remains open to this day.

Population 
As the censuses reveal, the village population has been remarkably stable. Presumably there was a charabanc trip on the night of the 1901 census but the population decline probably reflects the agrarian recession of the time when agricultural workers left the land for better paid jobs in the boom industries of the time – coal mining, quarrying and iron in Shropshire or further afield to South Wales.

Famous associations 
Albert Lee (born 21 December 1943), one of the world's greatest guitarists, was born in Lingen.

Ralph Lingen, 1st Baron Lingen, Permanent Secretary to the Treasury
Sir Henry Lingen, Royalist Commander in the English Civil War

References

External links

GENUKI page
Lingen Village
St Michael and All Angels Church
Mortimer Trail
Lingen Nursery
Lingen Loop Walk
Lingen Pottery

Villages in Herefordshire
Civil parishes in Herefordshire